The 1966 Individual Ice Speedway World Championship was the first edition of the World Championship.

The winner was Gabdrakhman Kadyrov of the Soviet Union. Kadyrov had previously won the 1964 European Ice Speedway Championship, the predecessor to this competition.

Final 

  Ufa February 19–20
  Moscow February 24–25

References

Ice speedway competitions
Ice